Qiaokou District forms part of the urban core of and is one of 13 urban districts of the prefecture-level city of Wuhan, the capital of Hubei Province, China, situated on the northern (left) bank of the Han River. Along with Dongxihu, it is the only district of Wuhan to not have any shoreline along the Yangtze River, and it borders Dongxihu to the north, Jianghan to the east, and Hanyang to the south across the Han River. 'Qiaokou' is used as an example of the usage of the rarely used character / in the Contemporary Chinese Dictionary. It is said that the character 'qiao' refers to stone bridges constructed over the Han River in the Late Qing. The district is part of the historical Hankou.

Geography

Administrative divisions
As of 2017, Qiaokou District was divided into eleven subdistricts:

References

External links
 Qiaokou District government official site

Geography of Wuhan
County-level divisions of Hubei